Serine/threonine-protein kinase H1 is an enzyme that in humans is encoded by the PSKH1 gene.

Interactions 

PSKH1 has been shown to interact with CDC6.

References

Further reading 

 
 
 
 
 
 

EC 2.7.11